Total Carp is a magazine published in the UK by David Hall Publishing Ltd, containing mostly articles of interest to carp fishermen. Angling generally is the largest participatory pastime in the UK.

History
Total Carp, Is the world's biggest-selling carp fishing magazine.

DHP bought Catchmore Carp from its previous owner and publisher Tim Hodges, who stayed on board as editor for a short period. In 1999 the magazine relaunched as Total Carp. Marc Coulson became editor in 2003. Deputy editor Dan Murrell became editor in 2016.

References

Hobby magazines published in the United Kingdom
Monthly magazines published in the United Kingdom
Magazines established in 1999
1999 establishments in the United Kingdom